Evenwel v. Abbott, 136 S. Ct. 1120 (2016), was a United States Supreme Court case in which the Court held that the principle of one person, one vote, under the Equal Protection Clause of the Fourteenth Amendment of the United States Constitution allows states to use total population, not just total voting-eligible population, to draw legislative districts.

Background 
The suit originated when Sue Evenwel and Edward Pfenninger filed suit in the United States District Court for the Western District of Texas, arguing that districts drawn based on total population dilute their vote compared to those in other Texas Senate districts. The district court dismissed the complaint for lack of a claim on which relief could be granted.

The question presented to the Court was the following: "Whether the 'one-person, one-vote' principle of the Fourteenth Amendment creates a judicially enforceable right ensuring that the districting process does not deny voters an equal vote."

Opinion of the Court
The Supreme Court affirmed the District Court and held that total population may be used in redistricting. It did not rule on whether states are permitted to base districts on the number of eligible voters, instead of the total population.

See also
Edward Blum – director of Project on Fair Representation
Reynolds v. Sims – a United States Supreme Court case that ruled that state legislature districts had to be roughly equal in population.

References

External links
 
Analysis by Social Explorer

United States One Person, One Vote Legal Doctrine
United States Supreme Court cases
United States Supreme Court cases of the Roberts Court
2016 in United States case law
Congressional districts of Texas
United States electoral redistricting case law